The  Longfellow–Hastings House, also known as the Octagon House, is an historic octagon house that was located at 85 South Allen Avenue in Pasadena, California. The house was built in 1893 by Gilbert Longfellow, who had previously built a similar house on the Atlantic coast. The two-story house has a frieze and a dentilated cornice and was originally surrounded by a verandah. It is one of the few octagon houses remaining in the Western United States.

The house was added to the National Register of Historic Places on March 2, 1982. It is now located at the Heritage Square Museum, its home since the mid-1980s.

References

External links

Octagon houses in California
Houses on the National Register of Historic Places in California
Buildings and structures on the National Register of Historic Places in Pasadena, California
History of Los Angeles County, California
Houses in Pasadena, California